Hanes (founded in 1900) and Hanes Her Way (founded in 1985) is a brand of clothing.

History
Hanes was founded in 1900 by John Wesley Hanes (one of Winston-Salem's wealthiest and most influential business men) at Winston, North Carolina under the name Shamrock Knitting Mills.

He died of heart trouble in 1903. In 1911, Shamrock Knitting Mills built a new plant at 3rd and Marshall Streets; it was sold in 1926 and occupied by a Cadillac dealership after a larger plant was built on West 14th Street.  Known as Shamrock Mills, the original building was listed on the National Register of Historic Places in 1978.  Shamrock Knitting Mills was named Hanes Hosiery Mills Company in 1914.

John Wesley Hanes' brother Pleasant H. Hanes founded the P.H. Hanes Knitting Company in 1901.  The brothers previously operated a tobacco manufacturing business, that they sold to R. J. Reynolds Tobacco Company in 1900.  The P.H. Hanes Knitting Company merged with Hanes Hosiery in 1965. The P.H. Hanes Knitting Company complex was listed on the National Register of Historic Places in 2005. In 1965 the Hanes Corporation was formed from the consolidation of two Hanes companies: P. H. Hanes Knitting Company and Hanes Hosiery Mills Company  In 1979, the corporation became part of Consolidated Foods (later renamed Sara Lee).

In September 2006, Sara Lee Corporation spun off its branded clothing Americas and Asia business as a separate company called Hanesbrands Inc., which designs, manufactures, sources and sells a broad range of clothing essentials. The company's portfolio of brands include Hanes (its largest brand), Champion (its second largest brand), Playtex (its third largest brand), Bali, Just My Size, Barely There, Wonderbra, L’eggs, C9 by Champion, Duofold, Beefy-T, Outer Banks, Sol y Oro, Rinbros, Zorba and Ritmo.

In 2016, HanesBrands acquired Pacific Brands for US$800 million, adding the Bonds and Berlei brands to its portfolio, as well as the Sheridan luxury linen brand. In February 2018 the Hanes Australasia division also acquired the Bras N Things brand for an estimated AU$500 Million.

During the coronavirus pandemic in United States, Hanes is retrofitting its factory to manufacture N95 masks for healthcare workers.

Products 
The Hanes brand is used by the company for marketing a variety of clothing:

 Innerwear
 Women's underwear, such as bras, panties and bodywear
 Men's underwear and undershirts
 Kids’ underwear and undershirts
 Socks
 Hosiery
 Outerwear
 Activewear, such as performance T-shirts and shorts
 Casualwear, such as T-shirts, fleece and sport shirts

Advertising
During the 1970s and 1980s, their women's hosiery tagline was "Gentlemen Prefer Hanes". In the early 1990s, the slogan was turned around as "The lady prefers Hanes".

From 1992 to 1999, the brand's main slogan was "Just wait'll we get our Hanes on you." The slogan was revived in 2005, with celebrity endorsements including  Michael Jordan, [s]], Matthew Perry and Marisa Tomei, as "Look who we've got our Hanes on now."

In 1996, Hanes was a major sponsor of the Atlanta Olympics. They produced a unique series of only 500 Beefy T-shirts; the first shirt was auctioned for $32,500, the highest price paid for a shirt was $42,000.

In the 2000s, an ad campaign began for their Hanes "Go Tagless" T-shirt, featuring various celebrities including Jordan, Phillip Brooke, Big Ben Kennedy, Jackie Chan, and Brian Regan.

As of July 2008, Charlie Sheen joined Jordan as the next Hanes celebrity spokesman. The commercials (along with the previous Cuba Gooding, Jr. commercials) were created by writer Brett Baker and Art Director David McKay of The Martin Agency in Richmond, Virginia. Hanesbrands has ended its advertising campaign featuring Sheen because of domestic violence charges filed against the actor in 2010.

In 2019, the company introduced body positive messaging with the "Every Bod" campaign for their FlexFit boxers, aimed to reduce the macho image associated with men's underwear.

References

External links

Official site
Hanesbrands company site
European Hanes website

Underwear brands
Lingerie brands
Hosiery brands
Textile companies of the United States
American companies established in 1900
Clothing companies established in 1900
1900 establishments in North Carolina
Hanes family
Hanesbrands